Wyantenock State Forest is a Connecticut state forest located in the towns of Warren, Kent and Cornwall. The forest consists of nine scattered parcels and was originally part of Mohawk State Forest. The forest is one of the least visited and developed state forests with little or no public access.

References

External links
Wyantenock State Forest Connecticut Department of Energy and Environmental Protection

Connecticut state forests
Parks in Litchfield County, Connecticut
Cornwall, Connecticut
Kent, Connecticut
Warren, Connecticut
Protected areas established in 1925
1925 establishments in Connecticut